Hải Dương is a city in Vietnam. It is the capital of Hải Dương, an industrialized province in the Hanoi Capital Region and the Red River Delta in Northern Vietnam. The city is at the midpoint between the capital Hanoi and major port Haiphong, and is part of the Northern Key Economic Zone. In 2019, Hai Duong city had a population of 507,469.

Name
The name first appeared officially in 1498. In feudal times, Hải Dương indicated a vast area from east of Hanoi to the sea. This area corresponds to all of modern Hải Dương, Haiphong, most of Hưng Yên and the southwestern corner of Quảng Ninh. Hải Dương city is in the middle of this historical area and was the location of a citadel defending the capital. Because of this historical location, Thành Đông (eastern citadel) is a common nickname of Hải Dương. The name "Hải Dương" (海陽) comes from Sino-Vietnamese and means "ocean sun" in English.

Geography
Hải Dương city is bordered to the north-east by Nam Sách and Thanh Hà districts, to the west by Cẩm Giàng District, and to the south by Gia Lộc and Tứ Kỳ districts, and also a branch of the Sat River. A branch of the Cái River (literally, "mother river" in Vietnamese) divides the city into two parts, on one side the urban area, and on the other side rural and industrial outskirts. The city is located in the centre of both the Northern Economic Area and of the Hanoi–Haiphong–Quảng Ninh development region as well. A railway, National Highway No.5 (Hanoi - Hải Dương - Haiphong) and National Highway No.18 (Bắc Ninh - Hải Dương - Quảng Ninh) all pass through the province.
Hải Dương Province is also located within the Red River Delta of northern Vietnam. It is bordered by Haiphong and Quảng Ninh provinces in the east, Hưng Yên in the west, Bắc Ninh and Bắc Giang in the north, and Thái Bình in the south.

Nowadays, highways make it easier to commute between Haiphong, Hải Dương and Hanoi. As of October 2017 it takes between 45 minutes and one hour to travel from Hải Dương to Hanoi.

Administrative divisions

Hải Dương city was built in 1804, and was first called "Thành Đông" (Sino-Vietnamese for eastern citadel), referring to the citadel east of Vietnam's capital, Hanoi. During the French colonial period, Hải Dương was a town. Before 1968, Hải Dương was a town in Hải Dương Province. Between 1968 and 1996 it was the capital of Hải Hưng Province after the provinces of Hải Dương and Hưng Yên merged to form Hải Hưng. On November 6, 1996, following the separation of Hải Dương and Hưng Yên provinces, Hải Dương became the capital of Hải Dương province. On August 6, 1997, Hải Dương was established as a city.

From 2019, Hải Dương city contains 20 wards (urban) and 7 communes (rural).

Wards
Ái Quốc
Bình Hàn
Cẩm Thượng
Hải Tân
Lê Thanh Nghị
Nam Đồng
Ngọc Châu
Nguyễn Trãi
Nhị Châu
Phạm Ngũ Lão
Quang Trung
Tân Bình
Tân Hưng
Thạch Khôi
Thanh Bình
Trần Hưng Đạo
Trần Phú
Tứ Minh
Việt Hòa

Communes
An Châu
Gia Xuyên
Liên Hồng
Ngọc Sơn
Quyết Thắng
Tiền Tiến
Thượng Đạt

Climate

Transport

Road

 National highway routes: 5, 191, 37, 17
 Main street:
 Avenue: Ho Chi Minh, Tran Hung Dao, Nguyen Luong Bang, Le Thanh Nghi, Vo Nguyen Giap (formerly October 30).
 Streets: Pham Ngu Lao, Truong Chinh, Thanh Nien, Thong Nhat, Ngo Quyen, Hong Quang, Yet Kieu, Dien Bien Phu, Bach Dang, Hoang Dieu, Nguyen Thuong Man, Chi Lang, Cuu Thanh, Hao Thanh, Hoang Hoa Tham, Bach Nang Thi, Bui Thi Xuan, An Thai, Pham Ngu Lao, Chuong Duong, Tam Giang, Quang Trung, Doan Ket, Cam Thuong, Ba Trieu, Do Ngoc Du, Nguyen Trac Luan, Phu Tho, Nguyen Quy Tan, Nguyen Thi Due, Dong Nien, Dancer Dan, Vu Huu, Duc Minh,...

Waterway

Hai Duong city has a quite convenient waterway transportation system. From Hai Duong city, according to the Thai Binh river system, boats can go down to Hai Phong Port, or back to the northern midland mountainous provinces.

Cong Cau Port is an inland waterway port with the function of loading and unloading goods - mainly raw materials - to and from other provinces and cities, the port has a capacity of 300,000 tons/year and a system of wharves and yards to meet the needs of domestic and foreign tourists. Transport goods by water in a convenient way.

Railway
The Hanoi-Hai Phong railway passes through Hai Duong city about 13 km, starting from Viet Hoa ward and ending at Ai Quoc ward. Connecting with other provinces at Hai Duong Station- the railway hub of the whole province, and Tien Trung is the transit station of the Northeast region of the province.

Gallery

References

External links

Hải Dương site
Hải Dương site
Hải Dương site
Hải Dương site

Provincial capitals in Vietnam
Populated places in Hải Dương province
Districts of Hải Dương province
Cities in Vietnam
Populated places established in 1804